The 2001 Sam's Town 300 was the third stock car race of the 2001 NASCAR Busch Series and the fifth iteration of the event. The race was held on Saturday, March 3, 2001, in North Las Vegas, Nevada at Las Vegas Motor Speedway, a  permanent D-shaped oval racetrack. The race took the scheduled 200 laps to complete. At race's end, Buckshot Racing driver Todd Bodine came back after a bad pit stop to pull away on the final restart with four to go to win his 13th career NASCAR Busch Series win and his second and final win of the season. To fill out the podium, Greg Biffle of Roush Racing and Jason Keller of ppc Racing would finish second and third, respectively.

Background 

Las Vegas Motor Speedway, located in Clark County, Nevada outside the Las Vegas city limits and about 15 miles northeast of the Las Vegas Strip, is a 1,200-acre (490 ha) complex of multiple tracks for motorsports racing. The complex is owned by Speedway Motorsports, Inc., which is headquartered in Charlotte, North Carolina.

Entry list

Practice 
Originally, there were two planned practice sessions to occur, with both being held on Friday, March 2, with the first being an hour-long session held at 11:15 AM PST, and the second being held after qualifying. However, both sessions were cancelled due to rain.

Qualifying 
Qualifying was held on Friday, March 2, at 12:15 PM PST. Each driver would have two laps to set a fastest time; the fastest of the two would count as their official qualifying lap. Positions 1-36 would be decided on time, while positions 37-43 would be based on provisionals. Six spots are awarded by the use of provisionals based on owner's points. The seventh is awarded to a past champion who has not otherwise qualified for the race. If no past champ needs the provisional, the next team in the owner points will be awarded a provisional.

No drivers would fail to qualify.

Full qualifying results

Race results

References 

2001 NASCAR Busch Series
NASCAR races at Las Vegas Motor Speedway
March 2001 sports events in the United States
2001 in sports in Nevada